Michael Potekhen (born August 15, 1979) is an American racing driver from Silverthorne, Colorado who competed in the Firestone Indy Lights Series. 

After starting in karts, Potekhen began racing in the Star Mazda West Series and Formula Vauxhall Winter Series in 1997. He competed in Star Mazda West until 2001 when he moved to U.S. Formula Ford 2000.

In 2003, he made his professional debut and finished fifth in the Star Mazda Pro Series. He competed in the Formula Mazda pro series from 2004 to 2006 and in May 2006 he made his Indy Pro Series debut at the Freedom 100 where he started and finished 11th. Potekhen made four other IPS starts that year. In 2007, he competed in a full season of the Indy Pro Series and achieved an IPS career-best finish of 2nd at the Milwaukee Mile and finished in a surprising 5th place in the championship.

With Apex Racing shutting down before the start of the season, Potekhen did not start the 2008 Indy Lights season until May 23, with SWE Racing/Chastain Motorsports in the Firestone Freedom 100. He returned to the team late in the season to make four more starts.

He missed the first four races of the 2009 season, but signed to join Alliance Motorsports for the Freedom 100. Potekhen returned to the team to make seven more starts and led his first laps in the series at Chicagoland Speedway late in the season. He finished 18th in points participating in only 8 of 15 races with a best finish of fourth at Homestead-Miami Speedway.

References

External links
 Mike Potekhen's homepage
 Two audio interviews with Mike Potekhen

1979 births
Indy Lights drivers
Living people
People from Summit County, Colorado
Racing drivers from Colorado
Indy Pro 2000 Championship drivers